Daughters, Daughters is a 1973 Israeli film directed by Moshé Mizrahi. It was entered into the 1974 Cannes Film Festival.

Plot

Cast
 Shaike Ophir - Sabbatai Alfandari
 Zaharira Harifai - Bianca Alfandari
 Joseph Shiloach - Joseph Omri
 Michal Bat-Adam - Esther Alfandari
 Gideon Singer - Dr. Mazor
  - Casarola
 Naomi Blumenthal - Naomi Greenbaum
 David Baruch

References

External links

1973 films
1973 drama films
Israeli drama films
1970s Hebrew-language films
Films directed by Moshé Mizrahi
Films produced by Menahem Golan